A standard certificate of airworthiness is a permit for commercial passenger or cargo  operation, issued for an aircraft by the civil aviation authority in the state/nation in which the aircraft is registered. For other aircraft such as crop-sprayers, a Special Airworthiness Certificate (not for commercial passenger or cargo operations) must be issued.

Legal authority
A certificate of airworthiness (CoA), or an airworthiness certificate, is issued for an aircraft by the civil aviation authority in the state in which the aircraft is registered.  The CoA attests that the aircraft is airworthy insofar as the aircraft conforms to its type design.  Each certificate is issued in one of a number of different categories when the aircraft is registered in the name of the owner. Thereafter, a yearly currency fee is payable to renew the CoA. If this fee is not paid when due, the certificate expires and the owner must apply again for the certificate. The CoA can only be issued when a maintenance release or certificate of release to service (CRS) from the maintenance facility declares that the maintenance due has been carried out and the aircraft is then certified as being airworthy.

In the US, Australia and some other countries a CoA is classified as either a standard airworthiness certificate or a special airworthiness certificate.

Standard airworthiness certificate
A standard airworthiness certificate is an airworthiness certificate issued for an aircraft by the civil aviation authority in the state in which the aircraft is registered. A standard airworthiness certificate is one of the certificates that are mandatory if an aircraft is to be used in commercial operations.  In the US, Australia and some other countries, a  standard airworthiness certificate is issued in one of the following categories:

 Transport
 Commuter
 Normal
 Utility
 Acrobatic
 Manned free balloons
 Special class of aircraft

The airworthiness certificate must be carried on board the aircraft and must be presented to a representative of the aviation authority upon request.

A standard airworthiness certificate remains valid as long as the aircraft meets its approved type design and is in a condition for safe operation.  In the US, a standard airworthiness certificate remains effective providing the maintenance, preventive maintenance and alterations are performed in accordance with relevant requirements and the aircraft remains registered in the USA.

A standard airworthiness certificate ceases to be valid when the aircraft ceases to be registered. Change of ownership of an aircraft does not require re-issue or re-validation of that aircraft's standard airworthiness certificate.

In contrast to a standard airworthiness certificate, an aircraft may be issued with a special airworthiness certificate.  Examples of aircraft which are not eligible for standard airworthiness certificates but may be eligible for special airworthiness certificates include agricultural aircraft, experimental aircraft, and some ex-military aircraft.

Special airworthiness certificate 

A special airworthiness certificate is an airworthiness certificate that is not sufficient to allow an aircraft to be used in commercial passenger or cargo operations.  In the United States a Special Airworthiness Certificate is issued in one or more of the following categories:

See also
 Type certificate
 Joint Aviation Requirements

Notes

References 

 The Code of Federal Regulations Title 14, Volume 1, Part 21

External links
UK Civil Aviation Authority
Sri Lanka

Aviation licenses and certifications
Aircraft maintenance